Frédéric Bouraly (born 3 May 1960) is a French actor.

Theater

Filmography

Dubbing 
Frédéric Bouraly was the French voice of several characters from animation Movies and TV Series.

References

External links

1960 births
Living people
20th-century French male actors
21st-century French male actors
French male film actors
French male television actors
People from Moulins, Allier